Khan Bani Saad is a majority Shia Arab city in Diyala Governorate, Iraq.

2015 massacre  

On 17 July 2015, a suicide bomber detonated a car bomb in the city's crowded market. Over 120 people were killed and 130 injured. The Islamic State of Iraq and the Levant (ISIL) claimed responsibility for the attack.

External links 
  Geo Links for Khan Bani Saad City

References 

Populated places in Diyala Province